Rob Ellis, better known as Pinch, is a British dubstep artist from Bristol, England, noted for his fusion of styles such as reggae, World music, and dancehall with dubstep. He released his first album, Underwater Dancehall in 2007, on Tectonic, which he founded. One of Pinch's most well-known tracks is "Qawwali", released on Planet Mu records, which references the devotional singing of the same name, and featured samples of harmonium and singer Nusrat Fateh Ali Khan. His songs appear on compilations such as Box of Dub: Dubstep and Future Dub 2  (Soul Jazz Records), Science Faction: Dubstep (Breakbeat Science Recordings), 10 Tons Heavy (Planet Mu) and 200 (Planet Mu). More recently, he has moved away from dubstep towards the UK bass scene, working with producers such as Mumdance and Adrian Sherwood.

Early life
Ellis was born in Scotland but moved to Newport, Wales at age 6 where he grew up until settling at nearby Bristol as an adult. As a child his interest in music was influenced by his older brother who made him tapes of Dub music.

Discography

Studio albums
Underwater Dancehall 2CD: Tectonic TECCD003, 2007
Pinch & Shackleton LP: Honest Jon's Records – with Shackleton, 2011
Late Night Endless (with Sherwood): Tectonic, 2015
Man Vs Sofa (with Sherwood): On-U Sound/Tectonics 2017
Reality Tunnels: Tectonic, 2020

EPs and singles
War Dub/Alien Tongue 12": Tectonic TEC001, 2005
Punisher 12"/Digital: Planet Mu ZIQ163, 2006
Punisher (remixes) 12"/Digital: Planet Mu ZIQ163R, 2006
Qawwali 12"/Digital: Planet Mu ZIQ133, 2006
One Blood, One Source/Trauma 12"/Digital: (limited edition album sampler) - Tectonic TEC017, 2007
Pepper Spray/Cave Dream 12"/Digital: Planet Mu ZIQ196, 2007
Chamber Dub 12"/Digital: Soul Jazz Records SJR 187–12, 2008
Dr Carlson/136 Trek 12"/Digital: Punch Drunk DRUNK 007, 2008
Croydon House/Elements 12": Swamp 81 SWAMP 007, 2011
Swish/Tunnel Home 12"/Digital: Deep Medi, 2011
Retribution/Get Out Of Here 12"/Digital: Swamp 81, 2011
Acid Reign/M25FM (with Photek) 12"/Digital: Photek Productions, 2012
Shoulda Rolla (with Roska)  Tectonic : 12"/Digital, 2013
 Bring Me Weed (with Sherwood) On-U Sound: 12"/CD/Digital, 2013
 Music Killer (with Sherwood) On-U Sound : 12"/CD/Digital, 2013
 Turbo Mitzi/Whiplash (with Mumdance) Tectonic : 12"/Digital, 2914
 Obsession (The Possession) Tectonic : 12"/Digital, 2014
 Down Cold Recordings : 12", 2014
 Big Slug/Lucid Dreaming (with Mumdance)  Tectonic: 12"/Digital, 2015
 Stand Strong (with Sherwood)  Tectonic : CD, 2015
 Screamer/ No Justice Tectonic : 12"/Digital, 2016

Compilation albums
FabricLive.61: Fabric, 2012

References

External links
Underwater Dancehall Review at Dusted Magazine
Pinch at Discogs
Promo Video for FABRICLIVE 61: Pinch

British electronic musicians
Dubstep musicians
1980 births
Living people
Musicians from Bristol
Planet Mu artists
Scottish electronic musicians
DJs from Bristol